In international law, document legalization is the process of authenticating or certifying a document so it can be accepted in another country.

Rationale and procedure
Due to the lack of familiarity with foreign documents or the entities that issue them, many countries require that foreign documents be legalized to be accepted there. This legalization procedure generally consists of a chain of certifications, by one or more authorities of the country of origin of the document and of the destination country. The first authority certifies the issuer of the document, and each subsequent authority certifies the previous one, until the final certification is made by an authority of the destination country that can be recognized by the final user there.

The certifying authorities generally include the Ministry of Foreign Affairs or equivalent of the country of origin and an embassy or consulate of the destination country located in the country of origin. For example, a Canadian document to be used in the Netherlands must be certified by Global Affairs Canada or the legalization service of a Canadian province or territory, then by an embassy or consulate of the Netherlands in Canada.

Some cases may require more certifications. For example, to be accepted in mainland China, a document from the U.S. state of Maryland not issued by a government official must be certified by a notary public, who must then be certified by the clerk of the circuit court in the notary's county, who must then be certified by the state of Maryland, which must then be certified by the U.S. Department of State, which must finally be certified by the Embassy of China in the United States. In some countries, an additional certification by the Ministry of Foreign Affairs of the destination country is also required.

On the other hand, some cases may require only one certification. For example, if the purpose of a Canadian document is to apply for a Dutch passport in Canada, it is sufficient for the document to be certified by Global Affairs Canada. For a document issued by a Canadian government authority to be used in Brazil, it is sufficient for the document to be certified by a Brazilian embassy or consulate in Canada.

Not all countries require legalization of foreign documents. For example, Canada, Japan, South Africa, the United Kingdom and the United States generally accept documents from any country without any certification.

Agreements
Some countries have agreements eliminating the legalization requirement for certain documents issued by each other, such as between Argentina and Italy, between Brazil and France, and between parties of the Convention on the Issue of Multilingual Extracts from Civil Status Records. The European Union also has a regulation eliminating the legalization requirement for certain documents of its member states to be accepted by each other.

Apostille Convention
The Apostille Convention is intended to simplify the legalization procedure by replacing it with a certification called an apostille, issued by an authority designated by the country of origin. If the convention applies between two countries, the apostille is sufficient for the document to be accepted in the destination country.

Ideally the apostille would be the only certification needed, but in some cases additional certifications in the country of origin may be required before the apostille is issued. For example, documents not issued by a government official may need to be certified by a notary; in some U.S. states, documents certified by a notary or city official must then be certified by the respective county or court; finally the apostille may be issued, certifying the previous official. In any case, after the apostille, no certification by the destination country is required.

The Apostille Convention requires that countries part of the convention direct their embassies and consulates to no longer perform legalizations of documents where the convention applies. The removal of this service is intended to prevent excessive certifications potentially required by overzealous institutions, but in cases where a consular certification alone would otherwise be sufficient to legalize a document and the apostille procedure requires more steps or higher fees, the convention may actually result in a more complex or more costly procedure to certify the document.

References

International law legal terminology
Conflict of laws
Notary